Ferenc Hirt (29 September 1967 – 7 December 2018) was a Hungarian entrepreneur and politician, member of the National Assembly (MP) for Tamási (Tolna County Constituency V) from 2006 to 2014, and for Paks (Tolna County Constituency III) from 2014 to 2018. He was elected MP via the Fidesz national list in 2018. He was the first physically disabled MP in the Hungarian Parliament.

Biography
Hirt studied in Tamási and Szekszárd. He obtained a vocational diploma in 1985. After that he worked for the Tamási Építőipari Ktsz. as an electrician. He moved to the manufacturing unit of Orion Electronics in Tamási. In 1988, he suffered a car accident, after which he was confined to a wheelchair.

He joined Fidesz in 2005. He was elected to the National Assembly during the parliamentary election in 2006. He was a member of the Committee on Youth, Social, Family, and Housing affairs between 30 May 2006 and 5 May 2014. He also chaired Subcommittee on Equality and Disability between 2007 and 2010. He became a member of the Tamási municipal council in 2010.

Personal life
He had a daughter.

References

1967 births
2018 deaths
Hungarian businesspeople
Politicians with disabilities
Fidesz politicians
Members of the National Assembly of Hungary (2006–2010)
Members of the National Assembly of Hungary (2010–2014)
Members of the National Assembly of Hungary (2014–2018)
Members of the National Assembly of Hungary (2018–2022)
People from Tolna County